Hancourt is a commune in the Somme department in Hauts-de-France in northern France.

Geography

History
Hancourt was the French village to which the 22 survivors of the 2/4th Battalion of the Oxfordshire and Buckinghamshire Light Infantry retreated in spring 1918, after the Battalion was virtually wiped out in action on the Western Front.

Population

See also
Communes of the Somme department

References

World War I sites in France
Communes of Somme (department)